Javanese dance is the dances and art forms that were created and influenced by Javanese culture in Indonesia. Javanese dance movement is controlled, deliberate and refined. Javanese art often displays a finesse, and at the same time a serene composure which is elevated far above everything mundane. Javanese dance is usually associated with courtly, refined and sophisticated culture of the Javanese kratons, such as the bedhaya and srimpi dance. However, in a wider sense, Javanese dance also includes the dances of Javanese commoners and villagers such as ronggeng, tayub, reog, and jaran kepang.

Javanese dance and its discipline has different styles and philosophy compared to other Indonesian dance traditions. Unlike vigorous and expressive Balinese dance or cheerful and slightly sensual Sundanese dance, Javanese dance are commonly involving slow movements and graceful poses. Javanese dance have somewhat a meditative quality and tends to be more self-reflective, introspective and more oriented toward self-understanding. Javanese dance is usually associated with Wayang wong, and the palaces of Yogyakarta and Surakarta due to the nature of dance being a pusaka or sacred heirloom from ancestors of the palace rulers. These expressive dances are more than just dances, they are also used for moral education, emotional expression, and spreading of the Javanese culture.

Types of Javanese dance

Javanese dance reflects the stratified hierarchy of Javanese society, and roughly can be identified within two mainstream of traditions:
Court dances (tari kraton)
Commoner dances (tari rakyat)

Court dances (tari kraton)

The courtly Javanese palace dance is the type of dances that developed, nurtured and fostered by Javanese Kratons, mainly Yogyakarta Sultanate and Surakarta Sunanate, the patrons of Javanese Mataram culture. Javanese sultans are known as the patron and the creator of Javanese court dances.

Kraton dances employs sets of rules about certain dance movements, body and hand gestures that requires discipline to learn. Gamelan orchestra is the prerequisite for Javanese court dance performances as well as for other Javanese art forms such as Wayang performances. The serene elegance, slow pace and constrains of its movements gave Javanese dance a meditative traits. Javanese court dances were heavily influenced by Javanese Hindu-Buddhist legacy. As the result the costumes, jewelry and story, often reflects or based on Hindu epic tales of Ramayana and Mahabharata.

There are three basic types of courtly Javanese kraton dance:

Beksan putra – These are the dances for men, which serve two purposes: a military close-order drill and highlighting martial skills. Dancers may learn beksan putra dances to familiarize themselves with the movements for narrative dances.
Beksan putri – Putri is the Javanese word for female, and these dances include courtly dances designed for royal events with very precise movements and distinct staging with subtle layers of meaning. Such dances were often used for entertainment or courtship.
Beksan wayang – These are narrative dances from epic poems, and usually are named after the characters in them, usually an alus-style hero and a gagah-style villain.

Bedhaya

Surakarta
Bedhaya Ketawang
Bedhaya Pangkur
Bedhaya Duradasih
Bedhaya Mangunkarya
Bedhaya Sinom
Bedhaya Endhol-endhol
Bedhaya Gandrungmanis
Bedhaya Kabor
Bedhaya Tejanata
Bedhaya Dempel
Bedhaya La la
Bedhaya To lu
Bedhaya Alok
Yogyakarta
Bedhaya Semang
Bedhaya Tirta Hayuningrat
Bedhaya Bedhah Madiun
Bedhaya Partha Krama 
Bedhaya Sinom
Mangkunegara
Bedhaya Anglir Mendung
Bedhaya Bedhah Madiun 
Pakualam
Bedhaya Angron Akung
etc.

Srimpi

Surakarta
Serimpi Ludira Madu
Serimpi Sangupati
Serimpi Gondokusuma
Srimpi Renggowati
Yogyakarta
Srimpi Pandelori
Srimpi Jebeng
Srimpi Muncar
Srimpi Pramugari
Mangkunegara
Serimpi Anglir Mendung
Pakualam
Srimpi Renyep
etc.

Golek

Golek lambang sari
Bondan
Bambangan Cakil
Topeng
Banda Baya
Wiropratomo 
Golek Menak
etc.

Gambyong

Gambyong Retno Kusumo
Gambyong
etc.

Beksan

Beksan Lawung
Beksan Anglingkusuma
Beksan Jangerana 
Beksan Panji Ketawang
Beksan Wireng
Klana Raja
Klana Alus

Wayang wong

Wayang wong

Commoner dances (tari rakyat)

Topeng endel

Kethek ogleng

Lengger

Lengger lanang

Sintren

Angguk

Barongan

Tayub

Ronggeng

Kuda lumping

Topeng malang

Reog

Remo

It's the popular dances of the commoner. This is the type of Javanese dances that developed in villages or cities that located relatively quite far from Javanese kratons as the center of Javanese palace culture. Kawulo dances is lack in Javanese courtly dance discipline, constraints, and refinements. This type of dance relatively more open and adaptive to local preference as well as foreign influences.

Several dance forms function as courtship or social dance such as ronggeng, gandrung and tayub, while others are celebratory dances such as reog and kuda lumping. The movement of social dances, such as ronggeng and tayub are more vigorous and often erotic, closely related to Sundanese jaipongan. Because of the erotic nuances, those who perform this type of dance are sometimes perceived as intentionally being suggestive or even openly advertising sexual favors.

Gallery

See also

 Dance of Indonesia
 Balinese dance
 Sundanese dance
 Dance of Cambodia
 Dance of Thailand

External links
 Gambyong Sukoretno dance at Mangkunegaran palace
 Golek Sulung Dayung dance at Yogyakarta palace
 Ramayana Javanese dance at Prambanan temple

References

Brakel-Papenhuyzen, Clara (1995)Classical Javanese Dance Leiden KITLV Press 
Soedarsono (1984) Wayang Wong  Yogyakarta Gadjah Mada University Press

Javanese culture
Dances of Java
Dances of Indonesia